The Pawan Danavi Wind Farm (also internally known as the Kalpitiya Wind Farm, and LTL Holdings Wind Farm after its parent company) is a  onshore wind farm located near Kalpitiya, in the Puttalam District of Sri Lanka. The wind farm utilizes twelve of  wind turbines.

See also 

 Electricity in Sri Lanka
 List of power stations in Sri Lanka

References 

Wind farms in Sri Lanka
Buildings and structures in Puttalam District